Alex Bruno de Souza Silva (born 7 October 1993), known as Alex Bruno, is a Brazilian footballer who plays for Maktaaral.

References

External links
 
Alex Bruno at Zimbru website

1993 births
Living people
Brazilian footballers
Expatriate footballers in Poland
Expatriate footballers in South Korea
Expatriate footballers in Kazakhstan
Ekstraklasa players
K League 2 players
Kazakhstan Premier League players
Widzew Łódź players
Gyeongnam FC players
Suwon FC players
Londrina Esporte Clube players
FC Atyrau players
Association football midfielders